The Fourth Universal of the Ukrainian Central Council is a state-political act, that declared full state independence of Ukrainian People's Republic. Its appearance, in particular, was preceded by the start of peace negotiations of Ukrainian People's Republic with the Central powers in Brest-Litovsk (today in Brest, Belarus).

Description
By the document it was noted that "from now on Ukrainian People's Republic is becoming self-existing, from no one dependent, free, sovereign state of Ukrainian people" and has been announced about the desire for peaceful coexistence with all neighboring states that do not have right to intervene in its internal affairs. With this Universal there was confirmed the authority of state power of the Ukrainian Central Council until convocation of the Ukrainian Constituent Assembly. The General Secretariat of the Ukrainian Central Council as its executive office was transformed in Council of People's Ministers of the Ukrainian People's Republic, which was entrusted with the task to continue negotiations with the Central powers as fully independent and conclude a peace treaty.

The Universal contained appeals to the government and citizens of Ukraine to combat Bolsheviks and other "adversaries" who ravage and wreak havoc in the land. There have been declared the complete dissolution of the regular army and creation in its place a people's militia.

In economical sphere the task was set to transfer industrial enterprises to a peaceful state, anticipated establishment of state control over banks, the most important branches of trade, export-import, state monopoly on metal, coal and other strategic type of products. It was reported about already developed land law which will convey the land to the labor peasantry without compensation on the grounds of cancellation of private property and socialization before the beginning of the spring field work.

By the document it has been also confirmed all public liberties declared in the Third Universal of the Ukrainian Central Council, scheduled re-election to the people's councils, all citizens have been called to treat the elections to the Ukrainian Constituent Assembly with attention.

The Fourth Universal of the Ukrainian Central Council clearly defined the creation of a sovereign country as the ultimate goal of all Ukrainians.

International recognition
At about the same time on  it was announced that Great Britain recognized the Ukrainian People's Republic. The former British council-general for the South Russia in Odesa John Picton Bagge who was appointed as temporary chargé d'affaires arrived to Kyiv. He met with the General Secretary of International Affairs of Ukraine Oleksander Shulhyn.

See also 

 Constitution of the Ukrainian People's Republic
 Universals
 First Universal of the Ukrainian Central Council
 Second Universal of the Ukrainian Central Council
 Third Universal of the Ukrainian Central Council
 Unification Act

 Russian Constituent Assembly
 Ukrainian Constituent Assembly

Further reading
 Doroshenko, D. My recollections about the recent past (Мої спомини про недавнє минуле) . Lviv 1923-24. 
 Yakovliv, A. Fundamentals of the Constitution of the Ukrainian People's Republic (Основи Конституції УНР). Paris 1935. 
 Hrushevskyi, M. At the doorstep of a new Ukraine: ideas and dreams (На порозі нової України: гадки і мрії). Kiev 1991. 
 Myronenko, O. Declaration of Independence of the Ukrainian People's Republic in January of 1918 (Проголошення самостійності УНР у січні 1918). Kiev 1997. 
 Ukr. parliamentarism: past and modernity (Укр. парламентаризм: минуле і сучасність). Kiev 1999.

Notes

References

External links
 Universal of the Ukrainian Central Council (IV) (Універсал Української Центральної Ради (IV)). Verkhovna Rada. 
 Taras Hunczak. Appendix: The Four Universals. 
 Shurkhalo, D. The Fourth Universal of the Ukrainian Central Council – declaration of independence of the Ukrainian People's Republic (IV Універсал Української Центральної Ради – проголошення незалежності УНР). Pavlo Hai-Nyzhnyk personal website from Radio Liberty. 21 January 2013.
 Melnyk, Ihor. The first day of Independence (Перший день Незалежності). Zbruc. 25 January 2017
 On 22 January Ukraine will celebrate the 100th Anniversary of declaration of Independence of the Ukrainian People's Republic (22 СІЧНЯ УКРАЇНА ВІДЗНАЧАТИМЕ 100 РОКІВ ПРОГОЛОШЕННЯ НЕЗАЛЕЖНОСТІ УКРАЇНСЬКОЇ НАРОДНОЇ РЕСПУБЛІКИ). Ukrainian Institute of National Remembrance. 2018
 Zinchenko, Oleksandr. Independence No.1: When Hrushevskyi announced it, why Vynnychenko doubt it and Yefremov was against it (Незалежність №1: Коли Грушевський її оголосив, чому Винниченко сумнівався, а Єфремов був проти). Istorychna Pravda (Ukrayinska Pravda). 26 January 2015
 Polishchuk, Lyubov. This first year may be also the last. Newspaper "Den". 25 January 2008.

Political history of Ukraine
Government of Ukraine
1918 in law
1918 documents
1918 in international relations
Dissolution of the Russian Empire
Ukrainian independence movement
1918
1918 in Ukraine
January 1918 events
Ukraine 1918